The 1921 Campeonato Carioca, the sixteenth edition of that championship, kicked off on April 3, 1921 and ended on September 7, 1921. It was organized by LMDT (Liga Metropolitana de Desportos Terrestres, or Metropolitan Land Sports League). Fourteen teams participated. Flamengo won the title for the 4th time. No teams were relegated.

Participating teams

System 
The tournament would be disputed in two stages:

 First stage: The fourteen teams would be divided into two groups of seven: Série A, with the teams that had finished from 1st to 7th in the previous year's championship, and Série B, with those that had finished from 8th to 10th, and four teams promoted from the Second Level.The teams in each group played each other in a double round-robin format. The champions of Série A and Série B would qualify into the Finals, while the last-placed team in Série B would dispute a playoff against the champions of the Second Level.
 Final stage: However, before the Finals, the champions of Série B would have to play against the last-placed team of Série A. If they won that match, they qualified for the Finals while the other team would be relegated to the Série B. In case of any other result, the Série A champions would win the title automatically, and no relegation or promotion across groups would take place.

Championship

Série A

Playoffs

Série B

Playouts

Relegation Playoffs

Final phase 

Villa Isabel eliminated; Flamengo declared champions

Final standings

References 

Campeonato Carioca seasons
Carioca